Zakharov is a rural locality (a khutor) and the administrative center of Zakharovskoye Rural Settlement, Chernyshkovsky District, Volgograd Oblast, Russia. The population was 518 as of 2010. There are 20 streets.

Geography 
Zakharov is located 54 km southeast of Chernyshkovsky (the district's administrative centre) by road. Tormosin is the nearest rural locality.

References 

Rural localities in Chernyshkovsky District